Sabzi polo is an Iranian (Persian) dish of rice and chopped herbs, usually served with fish. In Persian, sabzi refers to herbs or vegetables (sabz means "green"); polo is pilaf, a style of cooked rice. 
The herbs used in sabzi polo vary, but typically include coriander, dill, chives or scallions, fenugreek, garlic and parsley. It can be made from both fresh and dried herbs.

It usually is served with pickled garlic and other traditional pickled herbs and vegetables.

See also

Iranian cuisine
Culture of Iran
Polow (pilaf, polo, pelau)
Khoresht
Nauryz kozhe

References

External links
Sabzi Polo (Sabzi Polow) Recipe
Polo or Chelo
Persian Pilaf, Polo
herbed rice(sabzi polo)

Rice dishes
Iranian cuisine
Persian words and phrases
New Year foods
Vegetarian dishes of Iran